General elections were held in the Netherlands on 22 January 1868.

Results

By district

Notes

References

General elections in the Netherlands
Netherlands
1868 in the Netherlands
January 1868 events
Election and referendum articles with incomplete results